José Agustín Arango Remón (February 24, 1841 - May 10, 1909) was a Panamanian politician who was, together with Tomás Arias and Federico Boyd, a member of the provisional junta that governed Panama after its independence in 1903. He was the Chairman of the Provisional Government Junta from 4 November 1903 until 20 February 1904.

He was elected as the first presidential designate by the National Assembly for the term 1908–1910, but he died before completing his term.

References 

• Mellander, Gustavo A., Mellander, Nelly, Charles Edward Magoon: The Panama Years. Río Piedras, Puerto Rico: Editorial Plaza Mayor. ISBN 1-56328-155-4. OCLC 42970390. (1999)

• Mellander, Gustavo A., The United States in Panamanian Politics: The Intriguing Formative Years." Danville, Ill.: Interstate Publishers. OCLC 138568. (1971)

1841 births
1909 deaths
People from Panama City
Panamanian people of Asturian descent
Panamanian Roman Catholics
Conservative Party (Panama) politicians
Vice presidents of Panama